Prostamide/prostaglandin F2alpha synthase (prostamide/PGF synthase, prostamide F synthase, prostamide/prostaglandin F synthase, tPGF synthase) is an enzyme with systematic name thioredoxin:(5Z,9alpha,11alpha,13E,15S)-9,11-epidioxy-15-hydroxy-prosta-5,13-dienoate oxidoreductase . This enzyme catalyses the following chemical reaction

 thioredoxin + (5Z,9alpha,11alpha,13E,15S)-9,11-epidioxy-15-hydroxy-prosta-5,13-dienoate  thioredoxin disulfide + (5Z,9alpha,11alpha,13E,15S)-9,11,15-trihydroxyprosta-5,13-dienoate

This enzyme contains a thioredoxin-type disulfide as a catalytic group.

References

External links 
 

EC 1.11.1